Talaba station is an optional proposed station on the Manila Light Rail Transit System Line 1. The station will be located at the intersection of Aguinaldo Highway and Evangelista Street in Talaba III, Bacoor.

Line 1 plan calls for an almost entirely elevated extension of approximately 11.7 km. The extension will have 8 passenger stations, with an option for 2 future stations (Manuyo Uno and Talaba), all intended to be constructed above-ground.

, the project is  61.60% complete.  The extension is slated for partial operations by late 2024 or early 2025 and full operations by second quarter of 2027.

References

See also
List of Manila LRT and MRT stations
Manila Light Rail Transit System

Manila Light Rail Transit System stations
Proposed railway stations in the Philippines